(September 15, 1978 – September 5, 2009), was a Japanese actress and singer.

Filmography
Baki the Grappler (2 episodes in 2001) – Mai

Discography
Baki the Grappler, Opening theme song
Grappler Baki Maximum Tournament, Ending theme song
 (2001)
Reborn (2001)
I loved ... (2001)
All alone (2001)

References

External links

2009 deaths
21st-century Japanese actresses
Japanese film actresses
1978 births
21st-century Japanese women singers
21st-century Japanese singers